Miss Grand Thailand 2020 was the eighth edition of the Miss Grand Thailand beauty contest, held on 19 September 2020 at Bangkok International Trade and Exhibition Centre in Bangkok, Thailand. Miss Grand Thailand 2019, Arayha Suparurk of Nakhon Phanom, crowned  of Ranong as her successor at the end of the event.

Background

Location and date
The eighth edition of the Miss Grand Thailand beauty contest was scheduled to be held on 19 September 2020. The press conference of the contest was conducted at the Novotel Bangkok Suvarnabhumi  Airport Hotel in Samut Prakan on 31 August, in which Chiang Rai was announced as the preliminary host province for the swimsuit contest, the darling of the host competition as well as all other ancillary activities, and the Bangkok International Trade and Exhibition Centre of Bangkok will be served as the venue for the national costume parade, preliminary competition, and the grand final coronation.

Competition

Pre-pageant activities

Thai Dress Fashion Show 

In a press conference to welcome the contestants of Miss Grand Thailand 2020 (Welcome Ceremony Press Conference), which was held on August 31, 2020, at the Grand Ballroom, Novotel Suvarnabhumi Airport Hotel. Samut Prakan Province There was a walk in an applied Thai fabric dress by all 77 contestants, all of which were designed and sewed by Thai designers who brought local local fabrics to sew into fashionable dresses under the concept of This is Me, This is Thailand: Thai Fabric in Lifestyle. The top 20 dresses that received the most votes via Facebook will be displayed in the exhibition of the contest.

Professional Sales Competition 

The professional sales contest of the Miss Grand Thailand 2020 contest was held on September 4, 2020, via the Dot Aris application's live-commerce system. The 77 contestants were divided into 11 teams of 7 contestants each, which teams can make sales of the contest's products. Through the application Dot Aris, the group that got the most value received prize money of 70,000 baht from Storage City Platform Company Limited

Results

Color Keys

§ —  Voted into the Top 10 by viewers

Miss Grand Thailand 2021

Miss Grand Thailand
The Miss Grand Thailand 2021 was appointed by the organization who will represent Thailand at Miss Grand International 2021.

Special Awards and Sub-contests

Special Awards

Miss Grand Rising Star Contest 

The Miss Grand Rising Star contest was held at the Novotel Suvarnabhumi Airport Hotel on September 4, 2020. Finalists were selected based on various personality criteria through self-introduction. in the first round Then selected by role-playing and answering questions from the judges in round 2 and round 3 by selecting 25, 10 and 3 finalists in each round, respectively. The winner of the Miss Grand Rising Star contest. The name 2020 will be announced during the final contest of Miss Grand Thailand 2020 on September 19, 2020, and will be signed as an actress under One 31.

Darling of the Host 

The Darling of the Host Contest was held on 8 September 2020 at the Utopia Conference Room, Le Méridien Chiang Rai Resort. The winner received a crown (The Artist's Crown) worth 500,000 baht and a cash prize of 50,000 baht. The 1st runner-up and the 2nd runner-up received a cash prize of 30,000 and 10,000 baht, respectively.

Best in Swimsuit 

The Best in Swimsuit Competition was held on September 9, 2020, at Le Meridien Chiang Rai Resort where the final 22 and 13 finalists were decided by voting through the Miss Grand Thailand page. The winner of the best swimwear was announced in the final round.

Best in National Costume 

The Best National Costume Competition will be held on September 16, 2020, at Hall 100, Bangkok International Trade and Exhibition Centre, Bangkok. In which the final 20 contestants will be selected from 10 judges, combined with a selection of 10 sets of votes through the page of Miss Grand Thailand, which announced the winners and runners-up in the finals. The best national costume and the runners-up that have been selected was brought to the representatives to wear to participate in the international contest.

Best in Evening Gown Contest 

The Best in Evening Gown Contest was judged by the evening dress used in the preliminary round held on September 17, 2020, at Hall 100, Bangkok International Trade and Exhibition Centre in which the final 20 contestants will be selected from the vote through the Miss Grand Thailand page. The winner of the best evening gown and runner-up was announced in the finals.

People's Choice

Best Provincial Director 

The Best Provincial Director was judged by them judging from the best of the competition, such as public relations for the contest, contest stage productions having missions in the province for beauty contestants, etc. The results were announced in the judging round on 19 September 2020.

Candidates

Northern group

Central group

Northeastern (Isan) group

Southern group

References

External links 
 
 Miss Grand Thailand official website
Beauty pageants in Thailand
Miss Grand Thailand
2020 in Thailand